The Saipa Saina is a subcompact sedan (B) produced by Iranian automaker Saipa. Saina is a facelifted version of Saipa Tiba which is ultimately based on Kia Pride. Saina is part of Saipa's X200 platform and is powered by a modified Kia Pride engine. Saina is available in four trims: EX, SX, SE-A And SE-A Lux.

Saina is a product of platform management in SAIPA Group. This automobile can complete the expectations of many Iranian families. Ergonomic design, acceptable appearance and state of the art suspension system are important features of this car. Saina passes Euro IV European Emission Standards with 1.5 L Engine and is equipped with ABS and EBD brake system. These features make Saina an ideal car to provide 0-60 of driving pleasure.

Saina facelift 2020

Saipa introduced the first Saina facelift on May 31, 2020. Unlike the previous generation, Saina has the Euro 5 emission standard in this version. Also, Saina's electrical platform has been changed to BCM system. According to Saipa CEO, this car will be replaced by Sahand.

Saina 2022 (Sahand)

In fact, Saipa Sahand is the second generation of Saina, which was introduced on 2022-08-31 and was released to the market in the following year (2023). The Sahand engine has Euro 5 emission standard (and can be upgraded to Euro 6) and is able  The power generation is 92 HP and the torque is 137 NM.  The fuel consumption of this car is approximately 6.98L per hundred kilometers.  Also, the mass of this car is about 250 kg (550 pounds) heavier than Saina.  This car replaced Saina in 2023.

Engine

Saina EV 

Saipa unveiled an all-electric battery-powered version of Saina in 2018. It was designed and developed in a partnership with KNTU. Saipa announced its plan to mass-produce the electric version, but it was halted after new sanctions against Iran. It takes 40 minutes to supercharge the EV. Saina EV has a 170 km estimated range.

Safety and Accessories 
 Driver and passenger airbags
 Air-conditioning
 Anti-theft immobilizer
 ABS + EBD brake
 Remote central locking
 Front power windows
 Foldable side mirrors adjustable from inside
 Rear windshield defrosting
 Windscreen wipers with adjustable speedv
 Digital dashboard display
 Front seatbelts with adjustable height
 Seatbelt with pretensioners
 Parking sensor
 Front lamps with leveling switch
 Remote central lock
 Foldable rear seat with ISOFIX (children seat)
 Outside temperature display
 Rear power window (optional)
 Digital Air-conditioning (optional)
 Audio (CD, radio and Mp3)

References 

Cars of Iran
Cars introduced in 2016
Saipa vehicles
Electric car models